Seychellia is a genus of long-legged cave spiders that was first described by Michael I. Saaristo in 1978.

Species
 it contains five species, found in Africa and China:
Seychellia cameroonensis Baert, 1985 – Cameroon
Seychellia jeremyi Wang & Li, 2011 – Ivory Coast
Seychellia lodoiceae Brignoli, 1980 – Seychelles
Seychellia wiljoi Saaristo, 1978 (type) – Seychelles
Seychellia xinpingi Lin & Li, 2008 – China

See also
 List of Telemidae species

References

Araneomorphae genera
Spiders of Africa
Spiders of China
Telemidae